The 1922 Colgate football team was an American football team that represented Colgate University as an independent during the 1922 college football season. In its first season under head coach Dick Harlow, the team compiled a 6–3 record and outscored opponents by a total of 297 to 62. Bernard Traynor was the team captain. The team played its home games on Whitnall Field in Hamilton, New York.

Schedule

References

Colgate
Colgate Raiders football seasons
Colgate football